Temchuk's bolo mouse (Necromys temchuki) is a species of rodent in the family Cricetidae.
It is found only in Argentina.

References

 Pardinas, U., D'Elia, G. & Teta, P. 2008.  Necromys temchuki.   2008 IUCN Red List of Threatened Species.   Downloaded on 19 April 2009.

Necromys
Mammals of Argentina
Mammals described in 1980
Taxonomy articles created by Polbot